The Pars Museum (Persian: موزه پارس)  is a museum in  Shiraz,  Fars Province, southern Iran. Founded in 1936 under Reza Shah Pahlavi, it is located in Nazar Garden.

The octagonal building was the place in which royal guests were hosted during the Zand dynasty of Iran. It was also used for holding official ceremonies.

It is also the burial place of Karim Khan Zand.

Nazar Garden
The old Nazar Garden was one of the largest gardens of Shiraz during the Safavid rule (1501–1722). During Zand dynasty (1750–1794) Karim Khan built an octagon structure which was called Kolah Farangi. It was used to receive and entertain foreign guests and ambassadors and hold official ceremonies.

Pars Museum
In 1936 the pavilion became a museum. It was the first museum which was located outside the capital city of Tehran. The brick designs, tiling, pictures and big stone dadoes are among the architectural features of the building.

Pars museum is a display of almost 30 handwritten Qurans, a number of magnificent paintings of famous Persian artists. Among the paintings is the well-known Karim Khan’s Smoking Shisha created by Jafar Naqash.

References 

Buildings and structures in Shiraz
Museums in Iran
Tourist attractions in Shiraz
1936 establishments in Iran